Van der Linden is a Dutch toponymic surname meaning "from the linden tree". It can also be spelled Vander Linden or Vanderlinden. Notable people with the surname include:

van der Linden
Anke van der Linden (born 1995), South African/ Dutch award winning jeweller
Antoine van der Linden (born 1976), Dutch footballer
  (1909–1987), Dutch film director
Dolf van der Linden (1915–1999), Dutch conductor
  (1781–1866), Belgian politician
Eric van der Linden (born 1974), Dutch triathlete
Floris van der Linden (born 1996), Dutch footballer
Gerard van der Linden (born 1981), Dutch rower
Gerry van der Linden (born 1952), Dutch novelist and poet
Henk van der Linden (footballer) (1918–1985), Dutch footballer
Henk van der Linden (1925–2021), Dutch filmmaker
James Van der Linden (born 1930), Belgian postal historian
Jan van der Linden (born 1955), Swedish Doctor (MD - PhD)
Jef Van Der Linden (1927–2008), Belgian footballer
Joannes Antonides van der Linden (1609–1664), Dutch physician, botanist, author and librarian
Jop van der Linden (born 1990), Dutch footballer
Lennart van der Linden
  (1951–1983), Belgian cyclist
Maarten van der Linden (born 1969), Dutch rower
Marc Van Der Linden (born 1964), Belgian footballer
Marcel van der Linden (born 1952), Dutch social scientist
Maritzka van der Linden (born 1962), Dutch swimmer
Martijn van der Linden (born 1979), Dutch illustrator
Nico Van Der Linden (born 1985), Belgian footballer
Peter van der Linden (born 1963), Dutch technology writer
Pierre van der Linden (born 1946), Dutch jazz drummer
Pieter Cort van der Linden (1846–1935), Dutch politician
René van der Linden (born 1943), Dutch politician
Rick van der Linden (1946–2006), Dutch composer and keyboardist
Rik Van Linden (b. 1949), Belgian road bicycle racer
Sabina van der Linden-Wolanski (1927–2011), Polish-Australian Holocaust survivor and author
Sander van der Linden, Dutch social psychologist
 (1884–1965), Dutch chemist after whom the insecticide Lindane is named
Tonny van der Linden (1932–2017), Dutch footballer
Wesley Van der Linden (born 1982), Belgian cyclist
Wim van der Linden (1941–2001), Dutch photographer and film and television director

Vander Linden, Vanderlinden 
Aubert Vanderlinden (born 1985), Belgian ballet dancer
Barbara Vanderlinden (born 1965), Belgian art critic, editor and curator
Guy Vander Linden (born 1948), American politician
 (1798–1877), Belgian revolutionary and politician
Pierre Léonard Vander Linden (1797–1831), Belgian entomologist
Ron Vanderlinden (born 1956), American football coach
Van Linden
Alex Van Linden (born 1952), Belgian cyclist, brother of Rik
Rik Van Linden (born 1949), Belgian cyclist, brother of Alex

See also
2538 Vanderlinden, a main-belt asteroid
Van der Linde

Dutch-language surnames